The omega constant is a mathematical constant defined as the unique real number that satisfies the equation

The name is derived from the alternate name for Lambert's  function, the omega function.

 .
 .

Properties

Fixed point representation 
The defining identity can be expressed, for example, as

or

as well as

Computation 
One can calculate  iteratively, by starting with an initial guess , and considering the sequence

This is because  is an attractive fixed point of the function .

It is much more efficient to use the iteration

because the function

in addition to having the same fixed point, also has a derivative that vanishes there. This guarantees quadratic convergence; that is, the number of correct digits is roughly doubled with each iteration.

Using Halley's method,  can be approximated with cubic convergence (the number of correct digits is roughly tripled with each iteration): (see also ).

Integral representations 
An identity due to Victor Adamchik is given by the relationship

Other relations due to Mező
and Kalugin-Jeffrey-Corless
are:

The latter two identities can be extended to other values of the  function (see also ).

References

External links
 

Omega
Articles containing proofs
Real transcendental numbers